The 2002 Fine Gael leadership election began in May 2002, when Michael Noonan resigned as party leader due to the party's poor performance in the 2002 general election. Noonan had only been party leader for little over fifteen months.  His successor was elected by the members of the Fine Gael parliamentary party on 5 June 2002. After one ballot the election was won by Enda Kenny. Kenny defeated Richard Bruton, Gay Mitchell and Phil Hogan.

Candidates

Standing
 Enda Kenny, TD for Mayo; former Minister for Tourism and Trade
 Richard Bruton, TD for Dublin North-Central; former Minister for Enterprise and Employment 
 Gay Mitchell, TD for Dublin South-Central; former Minister of State for European Affairs
 Phil Hogan, TD for Carlow–Kilkenny; former Minister of State at the Department of Finance

Declined to stand
 Denis Naughten, TD for Roscommon–South Leitrim

Result
49 members of the Fine Gael parliamentary party voted: 31 TDs, 14 Senators and 4 MEPs. The exact results were kept secret. Young Fine Gael delegates Lucinda Creighton and Leo Varadkar, later to become important figures in the party, criticised the procedure, writing "candidates for the Leadership are already sowing the seeds of Fine Gael's next election defeat by trading votes for votes with senators determined to make it back to Leinster House at any cost. The decision of the parliamentary party to decide the future of Fine Gael alone and behind closed doors is a disgrace and demonstrates their contempt both for the loyal Fine Gael membership and the 400,000 or so electors who voted for them. Shame on you all."

References

2002 elections in the Republic of Ireland
2002 in Irish politics
Leadership
History of Fine Gael
Fine Gael leadership elections
Indirect elections
Fine Gael leadership election